Decca Records is a British record label established in 1929 by Edward Lewis. Its U.S. label was established in late 1934 by Lewis, Jack Kapp, American Decca's first president, and Milton Rackmil, who later became American Decca's president. In 1937, anticipating Nazi aggression leading to World War II, Lewis sold American Decca and the link between the U.K. and U.S. Decca labels was broken for several decades. The British label was renowned for its development of recording methods, while the American company developed the concept of cast albums in the musical genre.

Both wings are now part of the Universal Music Group. The U.S. Decca label was the foundation company that evolved into UMG (Universal Music Group).

Label name
The name dates back to a portable gramophone called the "Decca Dulcephone" patented in 1914 by musical instrument makers Barnett Samuel and Sons. The name "Decca" was coined by Wilfred S. Samuel by merging the word "Mecca" with the initial D of their logo "Dulcet" or their trademark "Dulcephone". Samuel, a linguist, chose "Decca" as a brand name as it was easy to pronounce in most languages. That company was eventually renamed the Decca Gramophone Co. Ltd. and then sold to former stockbroker Edward Lewis in 1929. Within years, Decca Records was the second largest record label in the world, calling itself "The Supreme Record Company". Decca bought the UK branch of Brunswick Records and continued to run it under that name. In the 1950s, the American Decca studios were located in the Pythian Temple in New York City.

Classical music

In classical music, Decca had a long way to go from its modest beginnings to catch up with the established HMV and Columbia labels (later merged as EMI). The pre-war classical repertoire on Decca was not extensive, but was select. The 3-disc 1929 recording of Delius's Sea Drift, arising from the Delius Festival that year, suffered by being crammed onto six sides, being indifferently recorded and expensive; following issue in July they were already withdrawn by October the same year. However, it won Decca the loyalty of the baritone Roy Henderson, who went on to record for them the first complete Dido and Aeneas of Purcell with Nancy Evans and the Boyd Neel ensemble (Purcell Club, 14 sides, issued February 1936); and Henderson's famous pupil Kathleen Ferrier was recorded and issued by Decca through the period of transition from 78 to LP (1946–1952). Heinrich Schlusnus made important pre-war lieder recordings for Decca.

Decca's emergence as a major classical label may be attributed to three concurrent events: the emphasis on technical innovation (first the development of the full frequency range recording [ffrr] technique, then the early use of stereo recording), the introduction of the long-playing record, and the recruitment of John Culshaw to Decca's London office.

Decca released the stereo recordings of Ernest Ansermet conducting L'Orchestre de la Suisse Romande, including, in 1959, the first complete stereo LP recording of  The Nutcracker, as well as Ansermet's only stereo version of Manuel de Falla's The Three-Cornered Hat, which the conductor had led at its first performance in 1919.

John Culshaw, who joined Decca in 1946 in a junior post, rapidly became a senior producer of classical recordings. He revolutionised recording – of opera, in particular. Hitherto, the practice had been to put microphones in front of the performers and simply record what they performed. Culshaw was determined to make recordings that would be 'a theatre of the mind', making the listener's experience at home not merely second best to being in the opera house, but a wholly different experience. To that end he got the singers to move about in the studio as they would onstage, used discreet sound effects and different acoustics, and recorded in long continuous takes. His skill, coupled with Decca's sound engineering capabilities, took the label into the first flight of recording companies. His pioneering recording (begun in 1958) of Wagner's Der Ring des Nibelungen conducted by Georg Solti was a huge artistic and commercial success (to the chagrin of other companies). Solti recorded throughout his career for Decca, and made more than 250 recordings, including 45 complete opera sets. Among the international honours given Solti (and Decca) for his recordings were 31 Grammy awards – more than any other recording artist, whether classical or popular. In the wake of Decca's lead, artists such as Herbert von Karajan, Joan Sutherland and later Luciano Pavarotti were keen to join the label's roster.

However, Culshaw was, strictly speaking, not the first to do this. In 1951, Columbia Records executive Goddard Lieberson partnered with Broadway conductor Lehman Engel to record a series of previously unrecorded Broadway musical scores for Columbia Masterworks, including what Engel, in his book The American Musical Theatre: A Consideration, termed "Broadway opera", and in 1951, they released the most complete Porgy and Bess recorded up to that time. Far from being a mere rendering of the score, the 3-LP album set used sound effects to realistically recreate the production as if the listener were watching a stage performance of the work.

 Until 1947, American Decca issued British Decca classical music recordings. Afterwards, British Decca took over distribution through its new American subsidiary London Records. American Decca actively re-entered the classical music field in 1950 with distribution deals from Deutsche Grammophon and Parlophone. American Decca began issuing its own classical music recordings in 1956 when Israel Horowitz joined Decca to head its classical music operations. To further American Decca's dedication to serious music, in August 1950, Rackmill announced the release of a new series of disks to be known as the "Decca Gold Label Series" which was to be devoted to "symphonies, concertos, chamber music, opera, songs and choral music." American and European artists were to be the performers. Among the classical recordings released on Decca's "Gold Label" series were albums by Leroy Anderson, the Cincinnati Symphony Orchestra conducted by Max Rudolf and guitarist Andrés Segovia. American Decca shut down its classical music department in 1971.

Between 1973 and 1980, Decca championed new music through its Headline imprint. Works given their recorded premiere included pieces by Peter Maxwell Davies, Harrison Birtwistle, Luciano Berio, Hans Werner Henze, Witold Lutoslawski, Toru Takemitsu, David Bedford, Thea Musgrave, Andrzej Panufnik, Iannis Xenakis, Brian Ferneyhough and John Cage. Performers included Roger Woodward, Stomu Yamash'ta, Salman Shukur and the Grimethorpe Colliery Band, as well as the composers themselves.

For many years, Decca's British classical recordings had been issued in the U.S. under the London Records label because the existence of the American Decca company precluded the use of that name on British recordings distributed in the U.S. When the MCA and PolyGram labels merged in 1999 and created Universal Music, the practice was no longer necessary. Today Decca makes fewer major classical recordings, but still has a full roster of stars, including Cecilia Bartoli and Renée Fleming. Its back catalogue includes several landmark and critically acclaimed recordings, such as the Solti Ring, voted the greatest recording of all time by critics with the BBC Music Magazine, and Luciano Pavarotti remained an exclusive Decca artist throughout his recording career.

In 2017, Universal Music revived Decca's American classical music arm as Decca Gold under the management of Verve Music Group.

Popular music

In Britain, Decca bought out the bankrupt U.K. branch of Brunswick Records in 1932, which added such stars as Bing Crosby and Al Jolson
to its roster. Decca also bought out the Melotone and Edison Bell record companies. In late 1934, a United States branch of Decca was launched. In establishing the American unit, the founders bought the former Brunswick Records pressing plants in New York City and Muskegon, Michigan, which were shut down in 1931, from Warner Bros. in exchange for a financial interest in the new label. Decca became a major player in the depressed American record market thanks to its roster of popular artists, particularly Bing Crosby, the shrewd management of former US Brunswick general manager Jack Kapp, and the decision to price Decca at 35 cents. The US label also brought back the discontinued Champion label (from Gennett), as well as a short-lived version of the Broadway label. The following year, the pressing and Canadian distribution of U.S. Decca records was licensed to Compo Company Ltd. in Lachine, Quebec, a breakaway and rival of Berliner Gram-o-phone Co. of Montreal, Quebec. (Compo was acquired by Decca in 1951 although its Apex label continued in production for the next two decades.) By 1939, Decca and EMI were the only record companies in the U.K. That year, British Decca head Edward Lewis sold his interest in American Decca because of World War II.

In 1941, American Decca acquired Brunswick Records and its sublabel Vocalion Records from Warner Bros., which had a financial interest in Decca. In 1942, stock in American Decca began trading on the New York Stock Exchange as Decca Records Inc. Therefore, the two Deccas became separate companies and remained so until American Decca's parent company bought British Decca's parent company in 1998 (during this time, US Decca artists were issued in the UK on the Brunswick label until 1968 when MCA Records was launched in the UK). Artists signed to American Decca in the 1930s and 1940s included Louis Armstrong, Charlie Kunz, Count Basie, Jimmie Lunceford, Jane Froman, the Boswell Sisters, Billie Holiday, Katherine Dunham, the Andrews Sisters, Ted Lewis, Judy Garland, The Mills Brothers, Billy Cotton, Guy Lombardo, Chick Webb, Louis Jordan, Bob Crosby, Bill Kenny & the Ink Spots, the Dorsey Brothers (and subsequently Jimmy Dorsey after the brothers split), Connee Boswell and Jack Hylton, Victor Young, Earl Hines, Claude Hopkins, Ethel Smith, and Sister Rosetta Tharpe.

In 1940, American Decca released the first album of songs from the 1939 film The Wizard of Oz. However, it was not a soundtrack album but a cover version featuring only Judy Garland from the film, with other roles taken by the Ken Darby Singers.

In 1942, American Decca released the first recording of "White Christmas" by Bing Crosby. He recorded another version of the song in 1947 for Decca; to this day, Crosby's recording of "White Christmas" for Decca remains the best-selling single worldwide of all time. In 1943, American Decca ushered in the age of the original cast album in the United States, when they released an album set of nearly all the songs from Rodgers and Hammerstein's Oklahoma!, performed by the same cast who appeared in the show on Broadway, and using the show's orchestra, conductor, chorus, and musical and vocal arrangements. The enormous success of this album was followed by original cast recordings of Carousel and Irving Berlin's Annie Get Your Gun, both featuring members of the original casts of the shows and utilising those shows' vocal and choral arrangements. Because of the technical restrictions of recording on 78 rpm records, none of these scores were recorded totally complete; they were shorter than cast albums made after LPs were introduced. But Decca had made history by recording Broadway musicals, and the influence of these releases in the recording of theatrical shows in the U.S. continues to this day – in Decca's home country, the UK original cast albums had been a fixture for years. Columbia Records followed with musical theatre albums, starting with the 1946 revival of Show Boat. In 1947, RCA Victor released the original cast album of Brigadoon. By the 1950s, many recording companies were releasing Broadway show albums recorded by their original casts, and the recording of original cast albums had become standard practice whenever a new show opened.

Decca throughout the 1930s and early to mid-1940s was a leading label of blues and jump music with such best selling artists as Sister Rosetta Tharpe and Louis Jordan (who was the best selling R&B artist of the 1940s). In 1954, American Decca released "Rock Around the Clock" by Bill Haley & His Comets. Produced by Milt Gabler, the recording was initially only moderately successful, but when it was used as the theme song for the 1955 film Blackboard Jungle, it became the first international rock and roll hit, and the first such recording to go to No. 1 on the American musical charts. According to the Guinness Book of Records, it went on to sell 25 million copies, returning to the U.S. and U.K. charts several times between 1955 and 1974.  But due to management and promotion decisions, Decca lost its place as a major hit label on the U.S. R&B and pop charts as Bill Haley's popularity started to fade, in the late 1950s. Decca's strong country catalogue did very well throughout this period and they had a number of crossover-to-pop hits, as well as the blockbuster success of Brenda Lee, but many R&B and rock music artists passed through Decca with little success (The Flamingos, Billy Ward and his Dominoes, Bobby Darin, The Shirelles, etc.)

American Decca embraced the new post-war record formats adopting the LP in 1949 and the 45 rpm record around a year later while continuing to sell 78s. During the 1950s, American Decca released a number of soundtrack recordings of popular motion pictures, notably Mike Todd's production of Around the World in Eighty Days (1956) with the music of veteran film composer Victor Young. Since Decca had access to the stereo tracks of the Oscar-winning film, they quickly released a stereo version in 1958. Because American Decca bought Universal Pictures in 1952, many of these soundtrack albums were of films released by what was then called Universal-International Pictures.

In June and July 1957, Decca Records released the soundtracks from Hecht-Hill-Lancaster Productions' film Sweet Smell of Success. It was a landmark event in the soundtrack industry; the first time that a film had two separate soundtracks, each featuring completely different music. All of the music from Sweet Smell of Success was published by Calyork Music, a music publishing company founded by the film's producers Harold Hecht and Burt Lancaster, along with Hecht's brother-in-law, established music publisher Loring Buzzell, who secured the releasing of the music through Decca Records. The first soundtrack LP featured the jazz score composed by Elmer Bernstein, while the second soundtrack LP featured music composed and performed by the Chico Hamilton Quintet, a band that appears in the film.

In 1961, American Decca released the soundtrack album of Flower Drum Song, Universal Pictures' film version of the 1958 Rodgers and Hammerstein musical. In a reversal of the usual situation, in which American Decca had released original Broadway cast albums of three Rodgers and Hammerstein shows, this was the only film soundtrack album of a Rodgers and Hammerstein show ever released by Decca, while the Broadway cast album had been released by Columbia Masterworks.

The American RCA label severed its longtime affiliation with EMI's His Master's Voice (HMV) label in 1957, which allowed British Decca to market and distribute Elvis Presley's recordings in the U.K. on the RCA label (later RCA Victor).

British Decca had several missed opportunities. In 1960, they refused to release "Tell Laura I Love Her" by licensed artist Ray Peterson and even destroyed thousands of copies of the single. In 1962, Decca infamously turned down a chance to record The Beatles, believing "guitar groups are on the way out." Other refusals of note include the Yardbirds, the Kinks, the Who, and Manfred Mann. Decca had earlier accepted London-born pioneer rock'n'roll singer Terry Dene, who was later known as the British Elvis Presley, and another Merseyside singer, Billy Fury.

The turning down of The Beatles led indirectly to the signing of one of Decca's biggest 1960s artists, The Rolling Stones. Dick Rowe was judging a talent contest with George Harrison, and Harrison mentioned to him that he should take a look at the Stones, who he had just seen live for the first time a couple of weeks earlier. Rowe saw the Stones, and quickly signed them to a contract. Decca also released the first recording of Rod Stewart in 1964, ("Good Morning Little Schoolgirl"/"I'm Gonna Move to the Outskirts of Town".) Decca also signed up many rock artists (The Moody Blues, The Zombies, The Applejacks, Dave Berry, Lulu, Alan Price), The Marmalade, with varying degrees of success.

Staff producer Hugh Mendl (1919–2008) worked for Decca for over 40 years and played a significant role in its success in the popular field from the 1950s to the late 1970s. His first major production credit was pianist Winifred Atwell. He produced Rock Island Line, the breakthrough skiffle hit for Lonnie Donegan, and he is credited as the first executive to spot the potential of singer-actor Tommy Steele. Mendl's other productions included the first album by humorist Ivor Cutler, Who Tore Your Trousers? (1961), Frankie Howerd at The Establishment (1963), a series of recordings with Paddy Roberts (best known for "The Ballad of Bethnal Green"), numerous "original cast" and soundtrack albums including Oh! What a Lovely War and even an LP record of the 1966 Le Mans 24-hour race, inspired by his lifelong passion for motor-racing. Mendl was a driving force in the establishment of Decca's progressive Deram label, most notably as the executive producer of The Moody Blues' groundbreaking 1967 LP Days of Future Passed. He is credited with battling against Decca's notorious parsimonious treatment of their artists, ensuring that the Moody Blues had the time and resources to develop beyond their beat group origins into progressive rock, and he also used profits for pop sales to cross-subsidise recordings by avant garde jazz artists like John Surman.

British Decca lost a key source for American records when Atlantic Records switched British distribution to Polydor Records in 1966 in order for Atlantic to gain access to British recording artists which they did not have under Decca distribution. The Rolling Stones left Decca in 1970, and other artists followed. Decca's deals with numerous other record labels began to fall apart: RCA Records, for instance, abandoned Decca to set up its own UK office in June 1969, just before the Rolling Stones decided to also abandon Decca in favour of forming their own label. The Moody Blues were the only international rock act that remained on the label. The company's fortunes declined slightly during the 1970s, and it had few major commercial successes; among those were Dana's 1970 two-million selling single, "All Kinds of Everything", issued on their subsidiary label Rex Records.

Although Decca had set up the first of the British "progressive" labels, Deram, in 1966, with such stars as Cat Stevens and the Moody Blues, by the time the punk era set in 1977, Decca had pop success with such acts as John Miles, novelty creation Father Abraham and the Smurfs, and productions by longtime Decca associate Jonathan King. King had a hit, "Everyone's Gone to the Moon", on Decca while he was an undergraduate at Trinity College, Cambridge, and Edward Lewis recruited him as his personal assistant and "talent spotter". Decca became dependent on re-releases from its back catalogue. Contemporary signings, such as Slaughter & the Dogs and the pre-stardom Adam and the Ants (whose sole single with Decca, "Young Parisians", would later be a UK Top 10 hit on the back of the band's success at CBS), were second division when compared to the likes of PolyGram, CBS, EMI, and newcomer Virgin's rosters of hitmakers.

Spoken word
American Decca also released several notable spoken word albums, such as a recording of Charles Dickens's A Christmas Carol starring Ronald Colman as Scrooge, and a recording of the Christmas chapter from The Pickwick Papers read by Charles Laughton. These two separate 78-RPM albums were later combined onto one LP. Other spoken word albums included Lullaby of Christmas, narrated by Gregory Peck, a twenty-minute version of Moby Dick, with Charles Laughton as Captain Ahab, and The Littlest Angel, narrated by Loretta Young. British Decca released on LP, in 1968, the most complete version of Man of La Mancha ever put on vinyl records, a 2-LP album featuring most of the dialogue and all of the songs, performed by the show's original London cast. Keith Michell starred as Don Quixote and Cervantes, and Joan Diener was Aldonza/Dulcinea.  Around 1970, American Decca enjoyed success with LPS of soundtrack dialogue excerpts from the films of W.C. Fields, the Marx Brothers, and Mae West.  The Fields and Marx Brothers albums were narrated by radio personality and cartoon voice actor Gary Owens.

Country music

In 1934, Jack Kapp established a country & western line for the new Decca label by signing Frank Luther, Sons of the Pioneers, Stuart Hamblen, The Ranch Boys, and other popular acts based in both New York and Los Angeles. Louisiana singer/composer Jimmie Davis began recording for Decca the same year, joined by western vocalists Jimmy Wakely and Roy Rogers in 1940. From the late 1940s on, the US arm of Decca had a sizeable roster of country artists, including Kitty Wells, Johnny Wright, Moon Mullican, Ernest Tubb, Webb Pierce, the Wilburn Brothers, Bobbejaan Schoepen, Red Foley and  Lenny Dee. The main architect of Decca's success in country music was Owen Bradley, who joined Decca in 1947 and was promoted to vice-president and head of A&R for the Nashville operations in 1958. Decca quickly became the main rival of RCA Records as the top label for American country music, and remained so for several decades. Owen Bradley produced all of the music recorded by organist Lenny Dee.

As part of a licensing agreement with 4 Star Records, Patsy Cline joined the Decca roster in 1956 (after releasing three singles on Decca's Coral Records subsidiary, under the same agreement, beginning in 1955). While Cline's contract was held by 4 Star, the deal allowed Decca complete control of the recording sessions, including choice of Producer and musicians. However, it also restricted the choice of material available for Cline to record to only songs published by 4 Star. This proved to be a stipulation which hampered her career for several years. Between 1955 and 1960, Cline recorded one album and multiple singles under the agreement, but saw limited chart success and very little money. In 1960, she signed directly with Decca. No longer bound by the restrictions of the 4 Star agreement, Cline went on to achieve tremendous success on both the Country and Pop charts. She recorded two more albums, and released numerous singles, before her untimely death in a 1963 plane crash. A number of posthumous singles and albums appeared in the years following.

The Wilburn Brothers signed to the label in 1954, and were ultimately awarded a lifetime contract (20 years) in 1966. Doyle Wilburn negotiated a recording contract for Loretta Lynn, who signed to Decca in 1961 and remained with the label for over 25 years. Lynn was known as the "Decca Doll" until she became better known as the "Coal Miner's Daughter." Lynn also signed a lifetime contract in 1966. She was the biggest selling female country artist of the 1960s and 70s.

MCA Nashville reactivated the Decca label in the US, as a subsidiary, in 1994. Mark Chesnutt was transferred to Decca from MCA Nashville, while Dawn Sears was the first new act signed. Other artists signed to the revived label included Rhett Akins, Lee Ann Womack, Gary Allan, Rebecca Lynn Howard and Dolly Parton. With the decline in the genre's popularity and the contraction taking place in the industry during the late 1990s, MCA Nashville closed the Decca subsidiary in early 1999 shortly after UMG's purchase of PolyGram. Chesnutt, Womack, Allan and Howard were shifted to the MCA Nashville roster, while all other Decca artists were released.

In 2008, independent of UMG's Nashville operations, the Decca Music Group signed Country act One Flew South to the label. One album was released before the group departed. In the UK, Decca has signed several country acts in recent years including Nathan Carter, Lucie Silvas, Imelda May, Andy Brown, Una Healy, The Wandering Hearts and The Shires.

Technology developments

Full frequency range recording (ffrr) 
Full frequency range recording (ffrr) was a spin-off devised by Arthur Haddy of British Decca's development, during the Second World War, of a high fidelity hydrophone capable of detecting and cataloguing individual German submarines by each one's signature engine noise, and enabled a greatly enhanced frequency range (high and low notes) to be captured on recordings. Critics regularly commented on the startling realism of the new Decca recordings. The frequency range of ffrr was 80–15000 Hz, with a signal-to-noise ratio of 60 dB. While Decca's early ffrr releases on 78-rpm discs had some noticeable surface noise, which diminished the effects of the high fidelity sound, the introduction of long-playing records in 1949 made better use of the new technology and set an industry standard that was quickly imitated by Decca's competitors. Nonetheless, titles first issued on 78rpm remained in that form in the Decca catalogues into the early 1950s. The ffrr technique became internationally accepted and considered a standard. The Ernest Ansermet recording of Stravinsky's Petrushka was key in the development of full frequency range records and alerting the listening public to high fidelity in 1946.

The LP
The long-playing record was launched in the US in 1948 by Columbia Records (not connected with the British company of the same name at the time). It enabled recordings to play for up to half an hour without a break, compared with the 3 to 5 minutes playing time of the existing records. The new records were made of vinyl (the old discs were made of brittle shellac), which enabled the ffrr recordings to be transferred to disc very realistically. In 1949, in both the UK and the US, Decca took up the LP promptly and enthusiastically giving the British arm an enormous advantage over EMI, which for some years tried to stick exclusively to the old format, thereby forfeiting competitive advantage to Decca, both artistically and financially.

British Decca recorded high fidelity versions of all the symphonies of Ralph Vaughan Williams except for the ninth, under the personal supervision of the composer, with Sir Adrian Boult and the London Philharmonic Orchestra. Benjamin Britten conducted recordings of many of his compositions for Decca, from the 1940s to the 1970s; most of these recordings have been reissued on CD.

Stereo (ffss)
The British Decca recording engineers Arthur Haddy, Roy Wallace and Kenneth Wilkinson developed in 1954 the famous Decca tree, a stereo microphone recording system for big orchestras.

Decca started the first actual stereophonic recording 13–28 May 1954, at Victoria Hall, Geneva, the first European record company to do so; only two months before, RCA Victor had begun the first actual stereophonic recording in the U.S., 6–8 March 1954. Decca archives show that Ernest Ansermet and the Orchestre de la Suisse Romande recorded Antar by Nikolai Rimsky-Korsakov (Decca's official first actual stereo recording); Stenka Razin by Alexander Glazunov; Tamara by Mily Balakirev; Anatoly Liadov's Baba-Yaga, Eight Russian Folksongs, Kikimora; and Le Martyre de saint Sébastien by Claude Debussy. These performances were initially issued only in monaural sound; and in 1959, the stereo version of Le Martyre de saint Sébastien was issued only in the U.S. as London OSA 1104 (OS 25108); and stereo versions of others were finally issued from the late 1960s to the beginning of the 1970s as part of the ""Decca Eclipse"" series (in the UK) or "Stereo Treasury" series (in the U.S. on the London label).

The Decca stereo format was called (in succession to ffrr) "ffss", i.e. "full frequency stereophonic sound". With most competitors not using stereo until 1957, the new technique was a distinctive feature of Decca. Even after stereo became standard and into the 1970s, Decca boasted a special sound quality, characterized by aggressive use of the highest and lowest frequencies, novel use of tape saturation and out-of-phase sound to convey a livelier hall ambiance, plus considerable bar-to-bar rebalancing by the recording staff of orchestral voices, known as "spotlighting".  In the 1960s and 1970s, the company developed its "Phase 4" process which produced even greater sonic impact through even more interventionist engineering techniques. Big-band leader Ted Heath was an early pioneer of the Decca "Phase 4" sound. Decca recorded some quadrophonic masters that were released in Sansui's quadraphonic system called QS Regular Matrix.

Digital recording and mastering
Starting in late 1978, British Decca developed their own digital audio recorders used in-house for recording, mixing, editing, and mastering albums. Each recorder consisted of a modified IVC model 826P open-reel 1-inch VTR, connected to a custom codec unit with time code capability (using a proprietary time code developed by Decca), as well as outboard DAC and ADC units connected to the codec unit. The codec recorded audio to tape in 18 bits linear PCM at 48 kHz, with a maximum of eight channels. Later versions of the system used 20-bit recording. With the exception of the IVC VTRs (which were modified to Decca's specifications by IVC's UK division in Reading), all the electronics for these systems were developed and manufactured in-house by Decca (and by contractors to them as well). These digital systems were used for mastering most of Decca's classical music releases to both LP and CD, and were used well into the late 1990s. After the start of the new century, Decca became actively involved in pioneering a new generation of high-resolution and multi-channel recordings, including "Super Audio CD" (SACD) and "DVD-Audio" (DVD-A) formats. Decca is now routinely mastering new recordings in these formats.

Decca Special Products
Decca Special Products developed a number of products for the audio marketplace. These include:

 The Decca Ribbon tweeter
 Decca London phonograph cartridges: The Decca phono cartridges were a unique design, with fixed magnets and coils. The stylus shaft was composed of the diamond tip, a short piece of soft iron, and an L-shaped cantilever made of non-magnetic steel. Since the iron was placed very close to the tip (within 1 mm), the motions of the tip could be tracked very accurately. Decca engineers called this "positive scanning". Vertical and lateral compliance was controlled by the shape and thickness of the cantilever. Decca cartridges had a reputation for being very musical; however, early versions required more tracking force than competitive designs – making record wear a concern
 The Decca International tone arm: The Decca International tone arms were fluid-damped unipivot designs. They were designed to complement the Decca phono cartridges. They would enjoy a brief renaissance in the 21st century as they were almost a drop-in replacement for the pick-up arms of Lenco GL75 record turntables from the 1970s. The arm damping was via a viscous silicone fluid held in a well, and magnetic repelling force supported the arm, and provided anti-skate (bias compensation). New Old Stock arms rapidly sold out by 2008 as vintage hifi enthusiasts sought them for refurbishment projects.
 The Decca Record Brush. The idea of using carbon fibre (CF) to clean LPs came from Tristan Cooper who obtained some CF for use in his GRP racing car body. CF is very fine, stiff, and conducts electricity, making it ideal for cleaning narrow record grooves and conducting away any static electricity build-up. Tristan's brother Warwick developed the manufacturing process for the brushes, producing hundreds of thousands of "Million Bristle" CF brushes under the Decca brand.

Decca Special Products was spun off, and is now known as London Decca.

The American branch of Decca also marketed its own line of home audio equipment.

Later history

American Decca bought Universal-International in 1952, and eventually merged with MCA Inc. in 1962, becoming a subsidiary company under MCA. Dissatisfied with American Decca's promotion of British Decca recordings and because American Decca held the rights to the name Decca in the US and Canada, British Decca sold its records in the United States and Canada under the label London Records beginning in 1947. In Britain, London Records became a mighty catch-all licensing label for foreign recordings from the nascent post-WW II American independent and semi-major labels such as Cadence, Dot, Chess, Atlantic, Imperial and Liberty.

Conversely, British Decca retained a non-reciprocal right to license and issue American Decca recordings in the UK on their Brunswick (US Decca recordings) and Coral (US Brunswick and Coral recordings) labels; this arrangement continued until 1967 when a UK branch of MCA was established utilising the MCA Records label, with distribution fluctuating between British Decca and other English companies over time.

In Canada, the Compo Company was reorganised into MCA Records (Canada) in 1970.

The Decca name was dropped by MCA in America in 1973 in favour of the MCA Records label. The first-run American Decca label's final release, "Drift Away" by Dobie Gray (label No. 33057), reached No. 5 on the Billboard chart and received gold record status.

PolyGram acquired the remains of Decca UK within days of Sir Edward Lewis's death in January 1980. British Decca's pop catalogue was taken over by Polydor Records. Ironically, PolyGram descended from British Decca's former Dutch distributor Hollandsche Decca Distributie.

In Taiwan, PolyGram acquired 60% of Linfair Magnetic Sound (founded in 1961) in 1992, and renamed to Decca Records Taiwan. The name remains until 2002, when it decided to sell its 60 percent stake, and changed its name to Linfair Records, making the company independent from Universal Music. In addition to Decca label, Linfair Records also distribute V2 Records' releases, and some independent labels. However, Linfair Records' releases outside Taiwan will continue to be released internationally via Universal Music.

The Decca label is currently in use by Universal Music Group worldwide; this is possible because Universal Studios (which officially dropped the MCA name after the Seagram buyout in 1996) acquired PolyGram, British Decca's parent company in 1998, thus consolidating Decca trademark ownership. In the US, the Decca country music label was shut down and the London classical label was renamed as it was able to use the Decca name for the first time because of the merger that created Universal Music. In 1999, Decca absorbed Philips Records to create the Decca Music Group (half of Universal Music Classics Group in the US, with Deutsche Grammophon being the other half).

Today, Decca is a leading label for both classical music and Broadway scores although it is branching out into pop music from established recording stars: in 2007 its Motown: A Journey Through Hitsville USA by Boyz II Men reached No. 27 on the Billboard Top 200 Albums chart. In 2007 they won the race to sign English teen jazz sensation Victoria Hart and released her first album Whatever Happened to Romance in July. In December 2007, it was announced that Morrissey would be joining the Decca roster. In August 2009, it was revealed that American Idol alum, Clay Aiken, had signed with Decca. It reentered the American country music scene in 2008. There are two Universal Music label groups now using the Decca name. The Decca Label Group is the US label whereas the London-based Decca Music Group runs the international classical and pop releases by such world-famous performers as Andrea Bocelli and Hayley Westenra. The London Records pop label that was established in the UK in 1990, run by Roger Ames, and distributed by PolyGram became part of Warner Music Group in 2000 when he was hired to run that company. Universal Music reacquired trademark rights in 2011, and Warner Records 90 Ltd. (formerly London Records 90), a company that controlled most of London's post-1980 catalogue, was acquired by French company Because Music in 2017. They started licensing "London Recordings" name and logo from UMG, and Warner Records 90 was renamed London Music Stream Ltd.

It is also the distributing label of POINT Music, a joint venture between Universal and Philip Glass's Euphorbia Productions that folded shortly after the merger that created Universal Music. Ironically, the American Decca classical music catalogue is managed by sister Universal label Deutsche Grammophon. They include the recordings of guitarist Andrés Segovia. Before Deutsche Grammophon founded its own American branch in 1969, it had a distribution deal with American Decca until 1962 when distribution switched to MGM Records. Éditions de l'Oiseau-Lyre is a wholly owned subsidiary specialising in European classical music of the 15th to 19th centuries. American Decca's jazz catalogue is managed by GRP Records, an imprint of Verve Records. The American Decca rock/pop catalogue is managed by Geffen Records. American distribution of British Decca's rock/pop catalogue is handled by Island Records. The Decca Broadway imprint is used for both newly recorded musical theatre songs and Universal Music Group's vast catalogues of musical theatre recordings from record labels UMG and predecessor companies acquired over the years.

On 10 January 2011, Universal Music Group, which owns the masters to Decca Records, announced that it was donating 200,000 of its master recordings from the 1920s to the 1940s to the United States Library of Congress. The collection of master recordings will be cleaned and digitised. Included in this group are Bing Crosby's original recording of 'White Christmas' and thousands more by Louis Armstrong, Ella Fitzgerald, Billie Holiday, Judy Garland, Tommy Dorsey, Jimmy Dorsey, the Andrews Sisters and other famous and lesser-known musicians who recorded during this time period. Because of this transaction, once the Library has organised and cleaned the collection, the public will eventually have some degree of access to thousands of recordings that have been commercially unavailable for decades. According to the Los Angeles Times, "[a]s part of the agreement between UMG and the library, Universal retains ownership of the recording copyrights and the right to exploit the cleaned-up and digitized files for commercial purposes."

Today, Decca distributes UMG's jazz holdings led by Blue Note Records and Verve Records along with the classical music holdings led by Decca Classics, Philips Records and Deutsche Grammophon. It also distributes recordings from the Concord Music Group and Rounder Records.

Decca matrix prefixes
The following matrix prefixes were used by Decca:

Key
 A = classical
 Z = stereo
 L = London
 Xxxx = external recording

See also

Selected affiliated labels

 Brunswick Records
 Coral Records
 Deram Records
 Geffen Records
 Threshold Records

Personnel and staff

 Owen Bradley (1915–1998), head of Decca's Nashville operation and credited with helping to create the Nashville sound
 Paul Cohen (1908–1970), longtime executive widely attributed for helping Nashville flourish in the recording industry
 Milt Gabler (1911–2001), American Decca executive and producer from 1941 to 1971
 Henry Jerome (1917–2011), music director at Decca Records in the early 1950s; and A&R director for Coral Records beginning late 1960s
 Jack Kapp (1901–1949), American Decca founder
 Edward Lewis (1900–1980), financier who led Decca recording group for 5 decades
 Tony Meehan (1943–2005), drummer turned A&R
 Mitch Miller (1911–2010), joined Decca in 1965
 Alex Murray (born 1939), A&R
 Milton Rackmil (1906–1992) American Decca head from 1949 to 1972
 Dick Rowe (1921–1986), A&R executive
 Nat Tarnopol (1931–1987), former president of Brunswick Records
 Bob Thiele (1922–1996), headed Coral Records

Notes

References
 

  - See the chapter on "Getting on Record", pp. 62–75, about the early record industry and Fred Gaisberg and Walter Legge and ffrr (Full Frequency Range Recording).

External links
 Official website
 Decca Gold official site
 Decca Classics official site
 Decca Broadway official site
 Decca Records US official site
 Judy Garland Decca Records discography
 Decca West Africa series at British Library
 Decca Classical Discography, 1929–2009 at Internet Archive
 
 Decca Classical Discography, 1929–2009 at AHRC Centre for the History and Analysis of Recorded Music (CHARM)
 Decca in Discography of American Historical Recordings

 
American record labels
British record labels
Classical music record labels
Companies based in New York City
Jazz record labels
Labels distributed by Universal Music Group
Record labels established in 1929
1929 establishments in the United Kingdom
Record labels established in 1934
1934 establishments in the United States
MCA Records